Fluid Football is a mobile association football game developed by independent studio Chromativity and published by AppyNation for iOS, Android, Amazon Kindle, Barnes & Noble Nook, and BlackBerry devices. As of December 11, 2012, the game has received over one million downloads.

Development
Pundits Andy Gray and Richard Keys assisted in the creation of the game.

Reception
Android Magazine rated the game 5/5 and received the publication's editor's choice award: "What makes the game stand out is the level of tactical awareness you need to have – you need to negotiate the offside trap, while also making sure the receiving player is free in the penalty box before you shoot."

References

External links
 Official Facebook page

Association football video games
Android (operating system) games
IOS games
BlackBerry games
Video games developed in the United Kingdom